Sông Công is a provincial city (thành phố) of Thái Nguyên Province in the north-east region of Vietnam. Song Cong city is currently a Class-3 city. As of 2018 the city had a population of 109,409. The district covers an area of 98,37 km².

Song Cong is an industrial city, economic, administrative and cultural center in the South of Thai Nguyen province; It is an important traffic and socio-economic development hub of the Northeastern region. With the transitional position between the plain and the midland, the Cong River has national and provincial roads running through Hanoi to the South and Thai Nguyen City in the North, which is a very favorable condition. to promote trade with economic regions in the North of Hanoi Capital, the South of the Northern Midland and Mountainous Region with the center being Thai Nguyen City and the economic regions of Tam Dao - Vinh Phuc, Bac Ninh and Bac Giang. With special advantages, Song Cong has long been identified as a major industrial center and a hinge urban center and economic transshipment between regions inside and outside Thai Nguyen province.

On July 1, 2015, Song Cong solemnly held the 30th anniversary of the founding of Song Cong town, announced the establishment of Song Cong city and received the Third-class labor medal and the presence of many delegates. coming from cities and towns in Viet Bac area.

Location
Song Cong city borders Thai Nguyen city to the north; borders Phu Binh district to the east and Pho Yen Town to the west and south. The city has a quite favorable position: 65 km north of Hanoi capital, 15 km south of Thai Nguyen city, 45 km from Noi Bai International Airport, 17 km from Nui Coc Lake.

Geography
The Công River flows through the town. Sông Công itself means "Cong River".

Administrative divisions
 Wards (phường): Bách Quang, Cải Đan, Lương Châu, Mỏ Chè, Phố Cò, Thắng Lợi, Lương Sơn.
 Communes (xã): Bá Xuyên, Bình Sơn, Tân Quang, Vinh Sơn.

References

External links 
 Song Cong City
 Resolution to Establish Song Cong city, Thai Nguyen Province.

Districts of Thái Nguyên province
Cities in Vietnam
Thái Nguyên province